OpenRent is an online letting agent and property service provider, founded in 2012. It is a UK-based startup company focused on technological solutions to property rentals. It claims to be the largest letting agent in the UK based on number of properties, boasting over 5 million users as of 2022.

History
OpenRent was founded in 2012 by two University of Oxford graduates, Darius Bradbury and Adam Hyslop, after experiencing the difficulties as both private landlord and tenant in the UK property market.

In 2015, OpenRent had the largest number of advertised properties for UK agents, ending the year with more than 2,500 monthly listings. By 2021, OpenRent had let over 500,000 properties.

Investors 
Investors include Rocket Internet who invested £4.4m in 2017, and Northern & Shell who invested media for an equity stake in June 2014.

References

Property companies based in London
British companies established in 2012
Property services companies of the United Kingdom
British real estate websites